Food market may mean
Marketplace, a public market with vendor stalls or spaces
 A retail store selling food such as a
Grocery store
Supermarket
Hypermarket
General store (historically)
Food marketing, the science of marketing applied to food retailing